Calais is an unincorporated community in northern Alberta, on the south shore of Sturgeon Lake, surrounded by the Sturgeon Lake Cree Nation in the Municipal District of Greenview No. 16.

The community has the name of a local Roman Catholic priest.

References 

Localities on Indian reserves in Alberta
Localities in the Municipal District of Greenview No. 16